Amy Dickson (born 1982) is an Australian classical saxophone player.

Early life
Dickson was born in Sydney. She began to play piano at the age of two, and saxophone at the age of six.  She initially played 'some jazz' in her youth, but eventually focused her saxophone training entirely on the classical repertoire.  She made her concerto debut at age 16, playing the Concerto pour Saxophone Alto by Pierre Max Dubois, with Henryk Pisarek and the Ku-ring-gai Philharmonic Orchestra.  Dickson became a recipient of the James Fairfax Australian Young Artist of the Year.  She subsequently moved to London, where she took the Jane Melber Scholarship to study at the Royal College of Music with Kyle Horch.  She also has studied at the Conservatorium van Amsterdam with Arno Bornkamp.  During this time, she became the first saxophonist to win the Gold Medal at the Royal Overseas League Competition, the ABC Symphony Australia Young Performers Awards, and the Prince's Prize. Amy's UK studies were supported by a grant from the Tait Memorial Trust.

Career
In 2005 and 2011, Dickson performed for the Commonwealth Heads of Government Meetings at the Teatru Manoel in Valletta, Malta, and the Perth Concert Hall, Australia.  She has also performed at the Scottish Parliament in Edinburgh, St James’ Palace in London and for former Australian Prime Minister John Howard at Parliament House, Canberra.  In October 2013, Dickson won the Breakthrough Artist of the Year at the Classic Brits awards, the first saxophonist to be so honoured.

Dickson has commissioned new works from such composers as Brett Dean, Ross Edwards (composer), Peter Sculthorpe, Graham Fitkin, Steve Martland, Huw Watkins and Matthew Hindson.  She has also arranged concertante works by Philip Glass and John Tavener, originally composed for other solo instruments, for saxophone.  Now resident in London, she is an ambassador of the Australian Children’s Music Foundation and of The Prince's Foundation for Children and the Arts.

Discography

Albums

Awards and nominations

AIR Awards
The Australian Independent Record Awards (commonly known informally as AIR Awards) is an annual awards night to recognise, promote and celebrate the success of Australia's Independent Music sector.

|-
| AIR Awards of 2013
|Catch Me If You Can
| Best Independent Classical Album
| 
|-
| AIR Awards of 2015
|Island Songs
| Best Independent Classical Album
| 
|-
| AIR Awards of 2020
|In Circles
| Best Independent Classical Album
| 
|-

ARIA Music Awards
The ARIA Music Awards is an annual awards ceremony that recognises excellence, innovation, and achievement across all genres of Australian music. They commenced in 1987. 

! 
|-
| 2013
| Catch Me If You Can (with Melbourne Symphony Orchestra)
|rowspan="3" | Best Classical Album
| 
|rowspan="2" | 
|-
| 2015
| Island Songs (with Sydney Symphony Orchestra)
| 
|-
| 2022
| Ross Edwards: Frog and Star Cycle / Symphonies 2 & 3 (with Colin Currie, Lothar Koenigs, Yvonne Kenny, David Zinman, Sydney Symphony Orchestra, Markus Stenz & Melbourne Symphony Orchestra)
| 
|

References

External links section
Official website of Amy Dickson

1982 births
Living people
Australian saxophonists
Classical saxophonists
Women saxophonists
21st-century saxophonists
People educated at Redlands, Cremorne